Ilya Perfilyev (Perfiryev) (1583-1659), was a Russian explorer, polar seafarer and a founder of Verkhoyansk. In the summer of 1633 he headed a group, consisted of merchant-and-industrial people and Yenisey and Tobolsk Cossacks. In 1634 he discovered the Yana River and the Yana-Indigirka Lowland.

References
Slovari.yandex.ru
Perfilyev biography

Cossack explorers
Explorers of Siberia
Year of death missing
17th-century Russian people
Year of birth unknown